Tian En Constance Lien (born 24 June 1999) is a Singaporean female ju-jitsu practitioner who also formerly trained the sport of swimming. Her sister Charity Lien is a swimmer who has represented Singapore in swimming meets and her mother Yuen Shuang Ching was also a national swimmer.

She represented Singapore at the 2018 Asian Games and claimed a silver medal in the women's 62kg ne-waza event. She was the only medalist for Singapore in ju-jitsu at the 2018 Asian Games as she was the first Singaporean ever to claim an international medal in the sport of ju-jitsu.

Lien also won a gold medal in the women's 62kg ne-waza event at the 2019 Southeast Asian Games.

References 

1999 births
Living people
Singaporean female martial artists
Ju-jitsu practitioners at the 2018 Asian Games
Medalists at the 2018 Asian Games
Asian Games silver medalists for Singapore
Singaporean Christians
People from Singapore
Asian Games medalists in ju-jitsu
Southeast Asian Games gold medalists for Singapore
21st-century Singaporean women